Quzhou is a prefecture-level city in western Zhejiang province, People's Republic of China. Sitting on the upper course of the Qiantang River, it borders Hangzhou to the north, Jinhua to the east, Lishui to the southeast, and the provinces of Fujian, Jiangxi and Anhui to the south, southwest and northwest respectively. Its population was 2,276,184 inhabitants as of the 2020 census whom 902,767 lived in the built-up (or metro) area made of Qujiang and Kecheng urban Districts.
Chinese actress and singer Zhou Xun was born in Quzhou.

History

Descendants of Confucius 
During the Southern Song dynasty the descendant of Confucius at Qufu, the Duke Yansheng Kong Duanyou fled south with the Song Emperor to Quzhou, while the newly established Jin dynasty (1115–1234) in the north appointed Kong Duanyou's brother Kong Duancao who remained in Qufu as Duke Yansheng. From that time up until the Yuan dynasty, there were two Duke Yanshengs, once in the north in Qufu and the other in the south at Quzhou. An invitation to come back to Qufu was extended to the southern Duke Yansheng Kong Zhu by the Yuan dynasty Emperor Kublai Khan. The title was taken away from the southern branch after Kong Zhu rejected the invitation, so the northern branch of the family kept the title of Duke Yansheng. The southern branch still remained in Quzhou where they lived to this day. Confucius's descendants in Quzhou alone number 30,000. The Hanlin Academy rank of Wujing boshi was awarded to the southern branch at Quzhou by a Ming Emperor while the northern branch at Qufu held the title Duke Yansheng. Kong Ruogu aka Kong Chuan 47th generation was claimed to be the ancestor of the Southern branch after Kong Zhu died by Northern branch member Kong Guanghuang. The leader of the southern branch is Kong Xiangkai.

Second World War
During the Second World War, Imperial Japanese army used bacteriological weapons in Quzhou, spreading plague, typhoid and other diseases in Quzhou, as well as in Ningbo and Changde. As a result, between 1940 and 1948 more than 300,000 Chinese civilians in the area contracted the plague and other diseases, and an estimated 50,000 died in Quzhou alone.

Administration

The prefecture-level city of Quzhou administers 2 districts, 1 county-level city, and 3 counties.

Geography

Almost all the rivers of Quzhou feed into the Qiantang, which ultimately empties into Hangzhou Bay.

The terrain is higher in the west and the east. The territory of Quzhou Municipality is made up of plains (15%), hills (36%), and mountains (49%). In the north is the Qianli Gang mountain range and in the west the Yu Mountains. The highest mountains, the range known as the Xianxia Ling, lie in the south. The highest point in the city is at Dalong Gang, which rises to 1,500 m above sea level.

70.7% of the land is covered with forest. The rest is densely irrigated and farmed, producing citrus fruits, tea and mulberry leaves.

The north China plain is an important grain-producing areas is also the key area of nitrogen loss, Quzhou nitrogen loss in 2017 about 9000 tons, through effective to improve crops (wheat, corn, vegetables and animal (pig, eggs) in the production of reasonable management to further improve the Quzhou has been the development of the north China plain green agriculture.

Climate
Quzhou has a humid subtropical climate (Köppen Cfa) with four distinctive seasons, characterised by hot, humid summers and chilly, cloudy and drier winters (with occasional snow). The frost-free period lasts 251–261 days. Winds along the Qiantang River valley are predominantly north-easterly and north-east-easterly. Occasionally typhoons blow in from the Pacific Ocean. With monthly percent possible sunshine ranging from 25% in March to 59% in August, the city receives 1,810 hours of bright sunshine annually.

Tourism

 Ancestral Temple of the Southern Confucian Clan
It features green peaks and clear waters, and the huge rocks on top of the mountain support a horizontal rock to form a natural arch, the Tiansheng Bridge ("Nature-Formed").

Demographics

As of 2003, Quzhou municipality registered a population of 2,578,100. The vast majority are Han Chinese (99.16%) but there are also small minorities of She (0.73%) and Hui, Zhuang, Manchu and Miao (together making up 0.1%). Most of the people in Quzhou are engaged in agriculture (2,035,100). The genders are roughly evenly split. Population density is 273 people per km2. At any given time there are a handful of foreign (mainly European and Australian) teachers at the schools and university of Quzhou, as well as alleged but never seen Russian Military Personnel who work and advise at the military base.

Transportation

Quzhou is well served by both railways and highways. The city of Quzhou is a major connection hub between the three provinces of Anhui, Jiangxi and Fujian, with the Zhegan Railroad running through southern Quzhou and the Qu River flowing past northern Quzhou. .

Airport
Airplane timetable and more information can be found on Quzhou airport official website.
The nearest large-scale airport is Hangzhou International Airport, and its information can be found on Hangzhou International Airport Official Website

Railway

This railway has three stations in city, which are Longyou railway station, Quzhou railway station, Jiangshan railway station, Changshan Station, Kaihua Station. More information can be found on Quzhou Railway Website 

Highway
Quzhou South Station, also named as Quzhou Express Station,located in No.209 Shang Street, has 27 buses to Hangzhou, 18 to Jinhua, 8 to Ningbo, 6 to Wenzhou, and 3 to Shanghai daily. Another Express Station is located in He Hua Middle Road, on the south of newly built train station, and its destinations cover most cities in Jiangxi Province and Fujian Province. More bus information can be found on https://web.archive.org/web/20111231062848/http://www.icha.com.cn/RailwayStation/130.Html

Notes

References

External links

Government website of Quzhou
Government website of Quzhou
Brief Introduction of Quzhou

 
Cities in Zhejiang
Prefecture-level divisions of Zhejiang